This is a list of individual male winners in FIS Cross-Country World Cup from 1982 season to present. The list includes distance races, sprints and stage events as well as the distance and sprint stages of the stage events. Distance races have been part of the World Cup ever since its formation. Sprint discipline was first introduced in 1995/96 World Cup season and stage events are first introduced in 2006/07 World Cup season. World Championship and Olympic races were counted as World Cup races until the 1999 World Championships and the 1994 Winter Olympics.

History 

In 42 official World Cup seasons, as of 29 January 2023, 880 individual races (603 distance, 238 sprint, 39 stage events) for men were held. These events saw 881 winners, because one race (individual 15 km classic race on 3 February 2007) ended with a tie.

A total of 161 male cross-country skier from 19 nations have won at least one individual race. In this list Soviet Union and Russia listed separately but counted as one nation. West Germany and Germany listed together since there is no East German winner and the only West German winner Jochen Behle continued his career for Germany after the German reunification in 1990. The first winner was the Norwegian Pål Gunnar Mikkelsplass who won the 15 km individual race in Reit im Winkl on 9 January 1982. The newest member of the list is Harald Østberg Amundsen who won the 10 km freestyle individual race in Les Rousses on 27 January 2023.

With 61 World Cup victories, Norwegian Johannes Høsflot Klæbo is the most successful World Cup racer in the history. Among those, 35 wins have come in sprint races which makes him also the best male World Cup sprinter of all-time. The previous record holder Bjørn Dæhlie, has won 45 of his 46 victories in distance races and he is the best distance skier in World Cup history. In stage events, which is the newest individual race format, Klæbo shares the top spot with another Norwegian Martin Johnsrud Sundby at 8 victories.

Pål Gunnar Mikkelsplass was also the first skier to win races in two and three different seasons as he won the opening races of the first two official World Cup seasons (1981/82, 1982/83) and the 1984/85 season. The Kazakh Vladimir Smirnov and the Norwegian Petter Northug won races in 11 different seasons, but Northug has won races in 11 consecutive seasons and he is still only skier to do so.  Gunde Svan was the first skier to win a race in four, five, six, seven, eight and nine seasons and all these seasons were consecutive. Throughout his 9-season long career, Svan managed to win at least one race in every season he competed. Bjørn Dæhlie has won races for 10 consecutive seasons from 1989/90 to 1998/99 which made him the only skier who won a race in every year in a single decade. Smirnov was the first to win races in ten and eleven seasons, while Dæhlie was the first to win in ten consecutive seasons and Northug was the first and the only skier to win in eleven consecutive seasons.

The youngest male winner is Petter Northug (born 6 January 1986) who won the 20 km pursuit race in Falun on 8 March 2006 at the age of 20 years and 61 days. The oldest winner is Harri Kirvesniemi (born 10 May 1958) who was aged 41 years 306 days when he won the prestigious 50 km classical mass start race in Oslo Holmenkollen on 11 March 2000, 17 years 358 days after his first race victory in Štrbské Pleso on 19 March 1982, which is also the longest time between the first and the last victory in the World Cup. The oldest skier to win his first race was Giorgio Di Centa (born 7 October 1972). When he won the 15 km individual freestyle race in Canmore on 5 February 2010 which was his only career victory, he was aged 37 years and 121 days.

Mikhail Devyatyarov and Mikhail Devyatyarov Jr. are the first father and son pair to win a World Cup race. They are followed by the Canadians Pierre and Alex Harvey. Apart from father-son pairs, there are two different brother pairs won a World Cup race: Mathias and Thobias Fredriksson of Sweden and Petter and Tomas Northug of Norway. From these two, the Fredriksson brothers were the first to do so. During the 2002/03 season, three consecutive World Cup races were won by Fredriksson brothers (two for Mathias and one for Thobias) which was also followed by the Northug brothers who became the winner of two consecutive races in the 2014/15 World Cup season after the victory in 2015 Tour de Ski was given to Petter Northug on 20 July 2016 due to illegal use of asthma medication by the initial winner Martin Johnsrud Sundby.

Statistics 

 Distance: Competitions of distances longer than 1.8 km
 Sprint: Competitions of distances shorter than 1.8 km
 Stage events: Overall winners of Stage World Cup events (Nordic Opening, World Cup Final, Tour de Ski, FIS Ski Tour, Sprint Tour and Ski Tour Canada)

Winners 

 N/A: Disciplines hadn't existed throughout athlete's entire career.
 Ties are shown in chronological order.

Milestones 
 First to win 10 races in one event:  Gunde Svan (distance)
 First to win 20 races in one event:  Gunde Svan (distance)
 First to win 30 races in one event:  Gunde Svan (distance)
 First to win 40 races in one event:  Bjørn Dæhlie (distance)
 First to win a race in two events:  Bjørn Dæhlie (distance and sprint)
 First to win 10 races in two events:  Johannes Høsflot Klæbo (distance and sprint)
 First to win a race in all three events:  Petter Northug

See also
List of FIS Cross-Country World Cup women's race winners

References

External links 
 International Ski Federation

race winners